"Bring Me to Life" is a song by American rock band Evanescence.

Bring Me to Life may also refer to:

"Bring Me to Life" (Thousand Foot Krutch song)
"Bring Me to Life", song by Marc Kinchen
"Bring Me to Life", song by Skylar Stecker
"Bring Me to Life", song by Jan Wayne